The Royal Bahamas Police Force is the national law enforcement agency of the Commonwealth of The Bahamas. It operates within the portfolio of the Ministry of National Security. The police force was established on 1 March 1840 and is headquartered on East Street Hill in Nassau, Bahamas.

History
From the early eighteenth century to the later part of the nineteenth century, the development of policing generally followed the pattern of policing in the United Kingdom of Great Britain and Ireland. During the first half of this period, men were appointed as constables to assist in the enforcement of government rules and regulations, and the apprehension of offenders. A night guard was also assigned to protect the town of Nassau, capital of the British Crown Colony of the Bahamas, during the night.
As early as 1729, there was a constable in New Providence. However, his duties seem not to have been as broad and well-defined as the police constable of today. This constable was attached to the local magistrate, justices of the peace and several other government officials.

In 1799, an Act of the General Assembly, now called the Parliament of the Bahamas, declared that all constables would have the same powers as their counterparts in Great Britain. They were then allowed to arrest on suspicion of crime as opposed to only after the crime had been committed. In 1827, the General Assembly stipulated their mode of appointment. During this period, only one constable was appointed to serve at a time in each district. These appointments were made by the serving magistrate with the assistance of two justices of the peace.

As time passed and crime increased, a small number of constables were appointed to serve at the same time. However, they were never organised as a formal police force. Each was responsible to the Magistrate in a particular district. This system of constables has evolved into the currently used district and local constables.

During the early years of British colonial rule, slaves made up the majority of the population in the Bahamas. The little policing needed was done by the free population with the help of constables, magistrates, and justices of the peace. Any slave rebellion or potential slave rebellion was kept in check by the local detachment of British soldiers and the slave owners.

Prior to the abolition of slavery by Act of the British Parliament in 1834, there was a system of night patrols in New Providence called the Night Guard. The men forming this guard were not constables, but were also supervised by the local magistrate. Their duties were primarily to protect the homes and businesses of the free population at night. In addition, the West India Regiment was stationed in Nassau to take care of any serious breach of peace throughout The Bahamas. These men were trained soldiers recruited from different ethnic groups in Africa and the Caribbean. They lived in barracks in isolation from the populations to ensure their loyalty in the event of local slave rebellions. In addition, their duties also included the protection of the islands from foreign invaders. At that time, the barracks was situated on the site where the Hilton British Colonial Hotel currently stands.

The majority of the Family Islands which make up The Bahamas were largely neglected as far as law enforcement was concerned, as crime in these areas was almost non-existent.

Structure

The Royal Bahamas Police Force is headed by the Commissioner of Police, Clayton Fernander, who is supported in his role by one deputy commissioner, and eight assistant commissioners. The Commissioner of Police has command, direction and control of the Force and is the ex-officio Provost Marshall. The headquarters of the police force is located in Nassau, New Providence.

The rank structure is similar to that of the United Kingdom's Scotland Yard usage: constable; corporal; sergeant; inspector; assistant superintendent; superintendent; chief superintendent; assistant commissioner; deputy commissioner; and commissioner. There are just over 3,000 members on the force. The Royal Bahamas Police Force is headed by what is known as the 'Senior Executive Leadership Team' or 'SELT'. These officers (ranging from the rank of assistant commissioner to commissioner) are responsible for setting strategic objectives and policies, policing plans, development, and mobilization of the force. The Senior Executive Leadership Team consists of one Commissioner, one deputy commissioner, and eight assistant commissioners. They are:

 Clayton Fernander,  – Commissioner of Police  
 Leamond Deleveaux – Deputy Commissioner of Police 
 Theophilus Cunningham, MBA, BSc, AA – Assistant Commissioner of Police (Grand Bahama & Northern Bahamas District)
 Kendal Strachan – Assistant Commissioner of Police (Operations Management & Tactical Support) 
 Craig Stubbs – Assistant Commissioner of Police (Public Safety & Community Policing Services)
 Kirkwood Andrews, MSc, BS - Assistant Commissioner of Police (Corporate Services)
 Bernard K. Bonamy Jr. – Assistant Commissioner of Police (Family Islands District)
 Dellareece Ferguson – Assistant Commissioner of Police (Human Resources & Training)
 Zhivago Dames, MBA, BS – Assistant Commissioner of Police (Information & Communications Technology)
 Kenwood Taylor – Assistant Commissioner of Police (Crime Management & Criminal Investigations)

Activities

Operation Rapid Strike
Operation Rapid Strike is a project launched on 19 January 2011 at 5:00 pm by Commissioner Ellison Greenslade of the Royal Bahamas Police Force. The mandate of this operation is to "restore peace and civility to our communities". The stated aims of the project is to hunt persons involved in an array of crimes including murder, armed robberies, stabbings, break-ins, firearms related charges, etc. The operation is led by senior ranking officers such as superintendents. Other ranks inside the operation include inspectors, supervisory officers and junior officers. Some equipment used by the members of the operation include two thirty-two seat buses provided by the Government of the Bahamas.

See also
Royal Bahamas Defence Force
Fox Hill Prison
Government of The Bahamas

References

External links
Official website commissioner

Government of the Bahamas
Law enforcement in the Caribbean
Government agencies established in 1840
Law enforcement in the Bahamas
Law of the Bahamas